Mueang Phitsanulok is the capital district (amphoe mueang) of Phitsanulok province, lower northern region of Thailand.

History

Mueang Phitsanulok was the first class city in the northern part of Ayutthaya kingdom until the end of the kingdom in 1767. Also in the reign of King Taksin the Great, Phitsanulok was the first class city. In the Thesaphiban administrative reforms of King Chulalongkorn (Rama V) the city became the center of monthon  Phitsanulok. Also during these reforms the district was created in 1898. Luang Udom Khet Borihan became the first district head officer.

Geography

Location
Neighboring districts are (from the north clockwise) Phrom Phiram, Wat Bot, Wang Thong, Bang Krathum and Bang Rakam of Phitsanulok province.

Topography
Mueang Phitsanulok lies within the Nan Basin, although the district's western border with Bang Rakam district is essentially the boundary between the Nan Basin and the Yom Basin as well. The distinction between the basins is blurry in this region, as the terrain is flat, and residents have diverted much of the water flow for agriculture over the years. Both basins are part of the Chao Phraya Watershed. The important water resource is the Nan River, and the Khwae Noi River also flows through the district.

Climate

Nature
Not to far away is Thung Salaeng Luang National Park, .

Religion
As of 2019 the population of Mueang Phitsanulok district was 95 percent Buddhist with some active 83 Buddhist temples (Wats) and 26 samnak song (houses of monks that are not officially registered).
There are 11 Christian churches in Mueang Phitsanulok District and muslims have their Masjid Abubak Pakistan mosque.

Administration

Provincial government
The district is divided into 20 subdistricts (tambons), which are further subdivided into 173 villages (mubans).

Local government
Phitsanulok is a city municipality (thesaban nakhon) which covers tambon Nai Mueang. Aranyik is a town municipality (thesaban mueang). Hua Ro, Tha Thong, Ban Khlong, Phlai Chumphon and Ban Mai are Subdistrict municipalities (thesaban tambon). Ban Mai covers parts of tambons Wang Nam Khu and Wat Phrik. There are further 14 Subdistrict Administrative Organisations - SAO (ongkan borihan suan tambon).

Demography

Population
Mueang Phitsanulok district is with 291,311 people the most densely populated district of Phitsanulok Province. The other eight districts have a total population of 276,936 people.

Urban area
Urban population in Mueang Phitsanulok district is 158,534 people (54.4 percent). The urban area around the city of Phitsanulok has 156,547 people and around Ban Mai is this 1,987 people; 54.4 percent of the people in the district live in a municipal area, 132,277 people (45.6 percent) live in a non-municipal area.

Economy
Mueang Phitsanulok district is the shopping and service center of Phitsanulok Province.

Department stores
 Big C Supercenter
 CentralPlaza Phitsanulok
 Lotus and Lotus Extra
 Makro 1 and 2
 Thai Watsadu Phitsanulok

Service Facilities
 15 places of service facilities of the government in Hua Ro - Moo 4 and 5.
 49 banks and financial institutions.
 102 hotels.
 210 groups of "One Tambon - One Product" (OTOP).

Agriculture

Four main crops
Crop area is just 2.0 percent of the province's crop area.
Crop area is just 3.3 percent of the province's crop area.

Fruit trees and tree crops

Vegetable crops

Livestock farming
Livestock farming produced commodities from chicken 597,497; duck 101,252; swine 16,732; cattle 3,540; buffalo 1,736; goat 2,446 and goose 141.

Fishery
Total catch from freshwater aquaculture was 1,144 ton, or 9.4 percent of 12,169 ton from Phitsanulok Province.

Education
Mueang Phitsanulok district is the educational center of Phitsanulok Province. There are many educational institutions at all levels, from kindergarten to university level, both government and private.

Higher education
There are six higher education institutes in or around the district with 38,553 students:
Naresuan University with 16 faculties, 184 courses and with more than 22,000 students is leader of the universities in Phitsanulok province.
Pibulsongkram Rajabhat University with 6 faculties.
Rajamangala University of Technology Lanna, campus Phitsanulok with 3 faculties.
Phitsanulok University, a private university with 5 faculties is the last with 174 students.
Sirindhorn College of Public Health Phitsanulok Province.
Boromarajonani College of Nursing Buddhachinaraj.

Vocational education
Total seven vocational colleges with 11,023 students.

Secondary education
Total 12 upper secondary schools with 9,230 students.
Total 23 lower  secondary schools with 12,590 students.

Primary education
Total 87 primary schools with 20,877 pupils.

Healthcare

Government hospitals
There are four government hospitals in Mueang Phitsanulok District.
Buddhachinaraj Phitsanulok Hospital is the provincial's and city's primary public hospital with 1,000 beds.
Naresuan University Hospital is the regional tertiary care hospital.
Fort Somdet Phra Naresuan Maharat Hospital is the army hospital, which is open to the general public.
Royal Thai Air Force Wing 46 Hospital is the air force hospital, which is also open to the general public.

Private hospitals
Five private hospitals are in Mueang Phitsanulok District with total 400 beds:
Bangkok Hospital Phitsanulok 
Phitsanulok Hospital 
Pitsanuvej Hospital 
Ruamphaet Hospital
Radiotherapy and Nuclear Medicine Hospital

Health promoting hospitals
There are 24 health promoting hospitals in Mueang Phitsanulok District.

Infrastructure

Roads
Road 126, a multi-lane by-pass enables through-traffic to avoid the city of Phitsanulok, and connects to highway 11 to Uttaradit and Lampang in the north, and to highway 12 to Phetchabun in the east, and to highway 11 to Sing Buri in the south, and to highway 117 to Nakhon Sawan in the south, and to highway 12 to Sukhothai, Tak and Mae Sot in the west.

Buses
Phitsanulok Terminal 1 (Saen Phon Phai) and Terminal 2 (Samo Khae) provide the mass transport throughout Phitsanulok Province by some eight bus companies. Yanyon tour operates its own private bus station (Sua Thim) with only a busline to Bangkok.

Airport
Close to the city center (Aranyik), Phitsanulok Airport receives up to six flights a day from Bangkok (flight time approximately 60 minutes), which are operated by three airlines: Nok Air, Thai Air Asia and Thai Lion Air.

Railway
In the city center, Phitsanulok railway station mainly receives intercity trains on the Northern Line, operated by State Railway of Thailand, more than a dozen trains running in each direction each day.

Radio
There are eight radio stations in the district:
Sathaanii Witthayu Krajaisiang Thahaan Aakaat (Air Force Radio Station), 954 AM and 95.75, in the City of Phitsanulok
Sathaanii Witthayu Krajaisiang Haeng Pratheet Thai (Radio Thailand, Government Public Relations Department, PRD), 1026 AM and 94.25 FM, in Ban Khlong
Kong Thap Phaak Thii Saam (Third Army Area), 1116 AM and 1188 AM, in Aranyik
Witthayu Kong Phon Thahaan Raap Thii Sii (4th Infantry Division), 1377 AM, at Fort Somdet Phra Naresuan Maharat
Sathaanii Witthayu Phitaksantiraat (Communications Division, Royal Thai Police), 1422 AM, in Phitsanulok City
Sathaanii Withayu Krom Utiniyom Witthayaa (Meteorological Department), 104.25 FM, in Tha Thong
Ongkaan Suesaan Muanchon Haeng Pratheet Thai (Mass Communications Organization of Thailand, MCOT), 106.25 FM, in Bueng Phra
Mahaawitthayalai Naresuan (Naresuan University), 107.25 FM, in Tha Pho

Flooding 
In 2006, there were reported cases of leptospirosis among residents of Mueang Phitsanulok, contracted from standing water.

References

External links 
Amphoe.com (Thai)

Mueang Phitsanulok